Robert M. Curley (November 23, 1922February 12, 2001) was an American politician and jurist.  He was a Wisconsin Circuit Court Judge for 23 years in Milwaukee County, and served one term in the Wisconsin State Assembly.  His daughter, Patricia S. Curley, is a retired judge of the Wisconsin Court of Appeals.

Biography

Born in Milwaukee, Wisconsin, Curley served in the United States Navy from 1942 through 1946, and remained in the United States Navy Reserve until 1960. He attended the University of Notre Dame and received his law degree from Marquette Law School, practicing law from 1948 in Wisconsin.

He was elected to the  Wisconsin State Assembly in 1958 as a Democrat. He resigned from the Assembly in 1960 to accept appointment to the Wisconsin Circuit Court in Milwaukee County (then the 2nd Circuit).  He retired from the court in 1983, but was able to serve for five years alongside his daughter, Patricia S. Curley, who became a Circuit Court Judge in Milwaukee in 1978.

Judge Curley married Mary Irene O'Rourke.  In addition to their daughter, they had three sons.

Judge Curley died at Indian Harbour Beach, Florida.

Electoral history

Wisconsin Assembly (1958)

| colspan="6" style="text-align:center;background-color: #e9e9e9;"| Primary Election, September 9, 1958

| colspan="6" style="text-align:center;background-color: #e9e9e9;"| General Election, November 4, 1958

Wisconsin Circuit Court (1963, 1969, 1975, 1981)

| colspan="6" style="text-align:center;background-color: #e9e9e9;"| General Election, April 2, 1963

| colspan="6" style="text-align:center;background-color: #e9e9e9;"| General Election, April 1, 1969

| colspan="6" style="text-align:center;background-color: #e9e9e9;"| General Election, April 1, 1975

| colspan="6" style="text-align:center;background-color: #e9e9e9;"| General Election, April 7, 1981

Notes

1922 births
2001 deaths
Politicians from Milwaukee
University of Notre Dame alumni
Marquette University Law School alumni
Wisconsin lawyers
Wisconsin state court judges
20th-century American judges
People from Indian Harbour Beach, Florida
Lawyers from Milwaukee
20th-century American politicians
20th-century American lawyers
United States Navy personnel of World War II
Democratic Party members of the Wisconsin State Assembly